Dushyanth Weeraman is a Sri Lankan singer, dancer and actor who gained attention as the winner of the reality talent show "Sirasa Dancing Stars" in 2008. He is a winner of the "Ten Outstanding Young Persons of Sri Lanka award in 2013. Dushyanth Weeraman is an enterprising personality who’s taken the risk to diversify his brand and prove himself beyond his skills in arts and performance. Mr.Weeraman is the Founder/Chairman:Director of “Mango Friends” of Mango Friends Ambalangoda Yoluwo (Pvt) Ltd and is the founder/Chairman/Director of Magul.lk of Wedding Master (Pvt) Ltd. Dushyanth Weeraman is the leader of the Band Kurumba Music. He is also the younger brother of Santhush Weeraman who is one half of the Sri Lankan pop-duo, Bathiya and Santhush Dushyanth Weeraman is married to Stephanie Siriwardhana former Miss Sri Lanka for Miss Universe 2011.

Personal life
Dushyanth is married to Stephanie Siriwardhana, a former Miss Sri Lanka.

Actor 
Dushyanth has played numerous roles in local theater productions including the roles of "Raoul" in "The Phantom of the Opera, "Guttila" in "Guttila" and "Thomas" in "RAG".  
He debuted on the silver screen as lead character in the movie Dancing Star (film) with additional credits on the film's soundtrack.

Discography

References

External links
දුෂ්යන්ත් වීරමන්ගෙන් අහමු
T - PAIN WITH DUSHYANTH

Alumni of Royal College, Colombo
1983 births
Living people
Sinhalese musicians
Sri Lankan singer-songwriters